Christine Tell is a Canadian politician. She was elected to represent the electoral district of Regina Wascana Plains in the Legislative Assembly of Saskatchewan in the 2007 election. She is a member of the Saskatchewan Party.

Tell was born and raised in Regina, graduating from Miller Comprehensive High School and then receiving a psychiatric nursing diploma from Wascana Institute (SIAST).  After a short time working as a psychiatric nurse, she joined the Saskatoon Police Service and graduated from the Saskatchewan Police College.  She worked for three years in Saskatoon before returning to her hometown and joining the Regina Police Service in 1983.  She rose to the rank of sergeant and took an unpaid leave of absence to seek election in May 2007.

She served as president of the Regina Police Association for six years and was the first female in Canada to head the police association of a major service.

In January 2020, it was revealed that a company owned by Tell's son was renting a building from the Saskatchewan government below market value and at a financial loss for the government. An email from Saskatchewan Premier Scott Moe regarding the matter said, "Signing this sub-lease will result in a loss on the lease of $278K over the next 10 years." Tell requested a review of her conflict of interest from the Conflict of Interest Commissioner, and the provincial opposition Saskatchewan New Democratic Party called for an investigation into the arrangement and highlighted the need to strengthen the province's conflict of interest rules.

In January 2021, Tell admitted to traveling to California during the COVID-19 pandemic, despite the closure of the border between Canada and the United States to nonessential travel and public health advisories to avoid unnecessary travel. In response to Tell's travel during a surge in COVID-19 cases in Saskatchewan correctional institutions, inmates staged a hunger strike calling for her to resign from her position as Minister of Corrections and Policing.

Cabinet positions

References

External links
 Christine Tell

Saskatchewan Party MLAs
Women MLAs in Saskatchewan
Living people
Members of the Executive Council of Saskatchewan
Politicians from Regina, Saskatchewan
21st-century Canadian politicians
21st-century Canadian women politicians
Canadian nurses
Canadian women nurses
Canadian police officers
Women government ministers of Canada
Canadian trade union leaders
Year of birth missing (living people)